The India women's cricket team played the West Indies women's cricket team in February–March 2012. The tour consisted of five Women's Twenty20 Internationals (WT20I) followed by three Women's One Day Internationals (WODIs).

Squads

WT20I series

1st WT20I

2nd WT20I

3rd WT20I

4th WT20I

5th WT20I

WODI series

1st WODI

2nd WODI

3rd WODI

References

India women's national cricket team tours
Women's international cricket tours of the West Indies
2012 in women's cricket
International cricket competitions in 2012